Carl Butler and Pearl were an American country music husband-and-wife duo. Between 1962 and 1969, the duo released several singles and charted thirteen times on the U.S. country charts, reaching No. 1 in 1962 with their first single, "Don't Let Me Cross Over".

Biography
Carl Roberts Butler was born in Knoxville, Tennessee, United States, on June 2, 1927. He grew up influenced by Roy Acuff and the old time music around his home. He began singing at local dances at the age of 12 and, after service in World War II, sang with several bluegrass bands and then as a solo act on numerous radio shows, including the "Mid Day Merry Go Round" on WNOX in Knoxville, Tennessee. During this period he met Pearl Dee Jones, a Nashville native born September 20, 1927, whom he married in 1952.

In 1961, Carl Butler recorded "Honky Tonkitis", which made it to number 25 on the country chart. The following year, the Butlers were invited to join the Grand Ole Opry, and the exposure provided by the show helped them push "Don't Let Me Cross Over" to number one. Their first single as a duo spent almost three months at the top of the country music chart, and they remained one of country music's most popular duos for the next two decades. Later chart records included "I Wouldn't Change You If I Could", "Too Late To Try Again", "Loving Arms" and "I'm Hanging Up The Phone".

Carl Butler was also a songwriter, penning classics including "If Teardrops Were Pennies", a No. 8 hit for Carl Smith in 1951 and a top 10 single for Porter Wagoner and Dolly Parton in 1973, and "Crying My Heart Out Over You" which became Ricky Skaggs' first number one hit in 1981. The Butlers were also among the earliest supporters of Dolly Parton, with whom they had worked in Knoxville in the 1950s, and they helped to get her established in Nashville in the early 1960s. (Parton, in turn, paid tribute to the Butlers when she included "Don't Let Me Cross Over" on Treasures, a 1996 album of covers of some of her favorite songs.)

The Butlers continued to record throughout the 1970s but essentially retired to their ranch, "Crossover Acres", near Franklin, Tennessee, in the early 1980s. They made occasional guest appearances on the Opry until Pearl Butler died at the age of 60 on March 1, 1988. Carl made an unsuccessful attempt at a comeback after her death. He died of a heart attack on September 4, 1992.

Discography

Albums
{| class="wikitable"
! rowspan="2"| Year
! rowspan="2"| Album
! colspan="2"| Chart Positions
! rowspan="2"| Label
|-
! width="50"| US Country
! width="50"| US
|-
| 1963
| Don't Let Me Cross Over
| 
| align="center"| 104
| rowspan="3"| Columbia
|-
| 1964
| Loving Arms
| align="center"| 10
| 
|-
| 1965
| Old and the New
| 
| 
|-
| 1966
| The Great Carl Butler Sings
| 
| 
| Harmony
|-
| 1967
| Avenue of Prayer
| 
| 
| rowspan="4"| Columbia
|-
| 1968
| Our Country World
| 
| 
|-
| 1969
| Honky Tonkin'''
| align="center"| 41
| 
|-
| 1970
| Greatest Hits| 
| 
|-
| 1971
| For the First Time| 
| 
| rowspan="2"| Harmony
|-
| rowspan="2"| 1972
| Watch and Pray| 
| 
|-
| Temptation Keeps Twisting Her Arms| 
| 
| Chart
|-
| rowspan="2"| 1980
| Country We Love| 
| 
| Pedaca
|-
| Honky Tonkitis| 
| 
| CMH
|}

Singles
{| class="wikitable"
! rowspan="2"| Year
! rowspan="2"| Single
! colspan="2"| Chart Positions
! rowspan="2"| Album
|-
! width="50"| US Country
! width="50"| US
|-
| 1961
| "Honky Tonkitis" (Carl Butler)
| align="center"| 25
| 
| rowspan="2"| Don't Let Me Cross Over|-
| 1962
| "Don't Let Me Cross Over"
| align="center"| 1
| align="center"| 88
|-
| 1963
| "Loving Arms"
| align="center"| 14
| 
| Loving Arms|-
| rowspan="4"| 1964
| "Too Late to Try Again"
| align="center"| 9
| 
| Old and the New|-
| "My Tears Don't Show"
| align="center"| 36
| 
| rowspan="2"| Our Country World|-
| "I'm Hanging Up the Phone"
| align="center"| 14
| 
|-
| "Forbidden Street"
| align="center"| 23
| 
| single only
|-
| rowspan="4"| 1965
| "We'd Destroy Each Other"
| align="center"| 38
| 
| Old and the New|-
| "Just Thought I'd Let You Know"
| align="center"| 22
| 
| Loving Arms|-
| "Beers and Tears"
| 
| 
| rowspan="3"| singles only
|-
| "Our Ship of Love"
| align="center"| 42
| 
|-
| rowspan="3"| 1966
| "Wrong Generation"
| 
| 
|-
| "Little Pedro"
| align="center"| 31
| 
| Our Country World|-
| "Dreaming of a Little Cabin"
| 
| 
| Loving Arms|-
| 1967
| "For a Minute There"
| 
| 
| single only
|-
| rowspan="2"| 1968
| "If I'd Only Met You First"
| 
| 
| Our Country World|-
| "Punish Me Tomorrow"A
| align="center"| 28
| 
| rowspan="2"| Honky Tonkin'|-
| rowspan="3"| 1969
| "I Never Got Over You"
| align="center"| 46
| 
|-
| "We'll Sweep Out the Ashes in the Morning"
| align="center"| 63
| 
| rowspan="4"| singles only
|-
| "If Teardrops Were Pennies"
| 
| 
|-
| rowspan="2"| 1970
| "Used to Own This Train"
| 
| 
|-
| "Bottoms Up"
| 
| 
|-
| 1971
| "Temptation Keeps Twisting Her Arms"
| 
| 
| rowspan="3"| Temptation Keeps Twisting Her Arms|-
| 1972
| "She Didn't Come Home"
| 
| 
|-
| 1973
| "Heartaches for Lunch"
| 
| 
|-
| 1980
| "Motel Song"
| 
| 
| Honky Tonkitis|}
A"Punish Me Tomorrow" peaked at No. 25 on the RPM'' Country Tracks chart in Canada.

References

Country music groups from Tennessee
Country music duos
Grand Ole Opry members
Musical groups established in 1961
1961 establishments in Tennessee